Reinhold is a German male given name. This German name is originally from "Reinold", composed of two elements. The first is from ragin, meaning "the (Germanic) Gods" and wald meaning "powerful".

This name was popularised by the ancient German hero figure known as Reinhold von Montalban (The Four Sons of Aymon), Reinhold von Meilan (The Dietrich Saga), and ultimately, as Saint Reinhold von Köln.

The -h- is recorded in the Dietrich von Bern legendary figure De gude Reinholt van Meilan who was the only one spared the slaughter at Erminrich's castle due to his loyalty to Dietrich. Hence with the addition of the -h- the etymology is interpreted as the emphatic prefix regn- with hold, apparently meaning "solemnly loyal".

This name was brought to the British Isles by Viking conquerors, in the form of the Old Norse Rögnvaldr. In the 11th century, the Normans further established this name as Reinald and Reynaud. There are other spelling variations of this name, but all have the same etymological Germanic origin.

Cognate to English Reynold, Ronald, French Renault, Italian Rinaldo, Scandinavian Ragnvald, and Spanish Reynaldo.

Notable people with the surname include 
Erasmus Reinhold, 16th-century German astronomer; the lunar crater Reinhold is named after him
Hagen Reinhold (born 1978), German politician
Hugo Reinhold (1854–1935), Austrian composer and pianist
Judge Reinhold (born 1957), American actor
Karl Leonhard Reinhold (1757–1823), 18th-/19th-century Austrian philosopher
Karolin Braunsberger-Reinhold (born 1986), German politician
Meyer Reinhold (1909–2002), American classical scholar
Johann Heinrich Carl Reinhold (1788–1825), German painter and engraver
Christa L. Deeleman-Reinhold (born 1930), Dutch arachnologist

People with the given name include 
Reinhold "Dan" Fielding, fictional character in the TV series Night Court
Reinhold Glière (1875–1956), Russian and Soviet composer
Reinhold Hanning (1921 – 2017) – Germany (Poland) – Auschwitz death camp SS guard
Friedrich Reinhold Kreutzwald (1803–1882), Estonian writer
Reinhold Messner (born 1944), Italian mountaineer
Reinhold Mitterlehner (born 1955), Austrian politician
Reinhold Niebuhr (1892–1971), American theologian, public intellectual, and commentator
Reinhold Richard "Reince" Priebus (born 1972), American lawyer, former White House Chief of Staff for U.S. President Donald J. Trump
Reinhold Remmert (1930–2016), German mathematician
Reinhold Saulmann (1895–1936), Estonian Olympic sprinter
Reinhold Thiessenhusen (1864–1930), American politician
Reinhold Tiling (1893–1933), German engineer, pilot and rocket pioneer
Reinhold Würth (born 1935), German businessman
Reinhold Weege (1949–2012), American television writer, producer and director

References

Surnames of German origin
German masculine given names
Surnames from given names
hu:Reginald